Bramley railway station serves the suburb of Bramley, Leeds, England.

History

The original station was opened by the Leeds, Bradford and Halifax Junction Railway on 1 August 1854. This was closed by British Railways on 4 July 1966, the last trains having called on 2 July. The station had platforms opposite each other and were connected by a footbridge.

The present station off Stanningley Road opened on 12 September 1983 by Metro (West Yorkshire Passenger Transport Executive) and British Rail. The station's two wooden platforms are staggered.

Facilities

The station is unmanned and has a ticket machine on platform 2 as of spring 2019. There are shelters and passenger information screens on each platform, along with a system to provide train running information. Though there are ramps to each platform, disabled access to platform 2 is restricted by the path being narrow and opening out onto a busy main road.

Services

Westbound the frequency is similar, with trains heading to Bradford Interchange and Halifax. Two of three go beyond Halifax to Manchester Victoria, whilst the third terminates there (passengers for Brighouse and Huddersfield now need to change trains at Bradford Interchange on weekdays). One Manchester service now runs through to  via  since the May 2019 timetable update.

There is an additional 4th [train per hour] that runs Mon-Fri eastbound, just before 8am, which is operated by Grand Central on behalf of Northern - as such, tickets cannot be purchased on this service.

On Sundays there are two trains per hour towards Leeds and to Bradford Interchange.

The Northern service to  passes through Bramley but does not stop there.

References

External links

Railway stations in Leeds
DfT Category F1 stations
Former Great Northern Railway stations
Railway stations in Great Britain opened in 1854
Railway stations in Great Britain closed in 1966
Railway stations in Great Britain opened in 1983
Reopened railway stations in Great Britain
Northern franchise railway stations
1854 establishments in England